Syed Muhammad Mir Ali Naqvi (known as Mir Adal) was the Chief justice of the court of Akbar the Great. He was a native of Amroha, and served on the court from 1579 to 1581. He was known as "Mir Adal"; "Adal" means in equitableness Urdu. Syed Muhammad Mir was also governor of Sindh.

References

Year of birth missing
Year of death missing
Governors of Sindh